Jia Zhangke (born 24 May 1970) is a Chinese-language film and television director, screenwriter, producer, actor and writer. He is the dean of the Shanxi Film Academy of Shanxi Media College and the dean of the Vancouver Film Academy of Shanghai University. He graduated from the Literature Department of Beijing Film Academy. He is generally regarded as a leading figure of the "Sixth Generation" movement of Chinese cinema, a group that also includes such figures as Wang Xiaoshuai, Lou Ye, Wang Quan'an and Zhang Yuan.

Jia's early films, a loose trilogy based in his home province of Shanxi, were made outside of China's state-run film bureaucracy, and therefore are considered "underground" films. Beginning in 2004, Jia's status in his own country rose when he was allowed to direct his fourth feature film, The World, with state approval.

Jia's films have received critical praise and have been recognized internationally, notably winning the Venice Film Festival's top award Golden Lion for Still Life. NPR critic John Powers praised him as "the most important filmmaker working in the world today."

Early life 
Jia Zhangke was born in Fenyang, Shanxi, China. His interest in film began in the early 1990s, as an art student at the Shanxi University in Taiyuan. On a lark, Jia attended a screening of Chen Kaige's Yellow Earth. The film, according to Jia, was life changing, and convinced the young man that he wanted to be a director. Jia would eventually make it to China's prestigious Beijing Film Academy in 1993, as a film theory major, giving him access to both western and eastern classics, as well as an extensive film library.

Career

Early work 
While a student at the Beijing Film Academy, Jia would make three short films to hone his skills. The first, a ten-minute short documentary on tourists in Tiananmen Square entitled One Day in Beijing, was made in 1994 on self-raised funds. Though Jia has referred to his first directorial effort as inconsequential and "naive", he also described the short day and a half shoot as "excitement...difficult to express in words." But it was Jia's second directorial effort, the short film Xiao Shan Going Home (1995), that would bring him to the attention of the film world. It was a film that helped establish Jia's style and thematic interests and, in Jia's words, was a film that "truly marks the beginning of my career as a filmmaker." Xiao Shan would eventually screen abroad where it won a top prize at the 1997 Hong Kong Independent Short Film & Video Awards. More significantly, the film's success brought Jia in contact with cinematographer Yu Lik-wai and producer Li Kit Ming, two men who along with producer/editor Chow Keung would come to form Jia Zhangke's "core...creative team." With their support, Jia was able to begin work on Xiao Wu, which would become his first feature film. Before graduating, however, Jia would make one more short film, Du Du (1996), a film about a female college student faced with several life-changing decisions. The film, little seen and rarely available, was for Jia an exercise of experimentation and technique, as it was filmed without a script. For Jia, the film was an important learning experience, even if he was "not terribly proud" of the end result.

Underground success 
Upon graduation, Jia embarked on his first feature-length film, with producer Li Kit Ming and cinematographer Yu Lik-wai. Xiao Wu, a film about a pickpocket in Jia's native Fenyang, emerged from Jia's desire to capture the massive changes that had happened to his home in the past few years. Additionally, the film was a rejection of what Jia felt was the fifth generation's increasing tendency to move away from the reality of modern China and into the realm of historical legend. Shot on a mere 400,000 RMB budget (or about US$50,000), Xiao Wu would prove to be a major success on the international film circuit, bringing Jia a deal with Takeshi Kitano's production house.

Jia capitalized on his success with Xiao Wu with a two internationally acclaimed independent features. The first, Platform, was partially funded in 1998 through the Pusan Promotion Plan (PPP) of the Busan (Pusan) International Film Festival when Jia received the Hubert Bals Fund Award (HBF) for his project. (Ahn, Soo Jeong, The Pusan Film Festival, South Korean Cinema and Globalization, 2012, 104-105). Platform is about a provincial dance and music troupe transitioning from the 1970s to the early 1990s. The film has been called the masterpiece of the entire sixth generation movement.
Starring Wang Hongwei, Jia's classmate and star of Xiao Shan Going Home and Xiao Wu, Platform was also the first of Jia's films to star actress Zhao Tao, a former dance teacher. Zhao would go on to serve as Jia's muse as the lead female role in Unknown Pleasures, The World, and Still Life, as well as acting in 24 City and the short film Cry Me a River (both in 2008).

With 2002's Unknown Pleasures, Jia began a foray into filming in digital video (although his first experimentation with the medium came a year before, in 2001's short documentary In Public). Xiao Wu, Platform and Unknown Pleasures are sometimes seen collectively as an informal trilogy of China's transition into modernity. Unknown Pleasures, a meditation on the aimless "birth control" generation to emerge from the one-child policy helped cement Jia's reputation as a major voice in contemporary Chinese cinema. All this despite limited theatrical runs and obscurity in mainland China. Indeed, none of the three films was ever publicly released in the PRC, although unlicensed DVD sales were brisk, a fact commented on by Jia near the end of Unknown Pleasures when Xiao Wu, the character (Wang Hongwei again), attempts to buy the DVD of Xiao Wu, the film.

Wider success 

Beginning with 2004's The World, Jia began to work with official approval from the Chinese government. The shift from independent to state-approved was not in isolation, however, but was part of a broader movement by many "underground" film directors turning legitimate. For many critics, the shift to legitimacy did not blunt Jia's critical eye, and The World was well received both abroad and – somewhat surprisingly – by the Chinese government. Taking place in Beijing World Park, the film was also Jia's first to take place outside of his home province of Shanxi.

In 2006, Jia returned to his experimentation with digital film with his film Still Life. The film would see Jia's status both at home and abroad raised when it won the coveted Golden Lion in the 2006 Venice Film Festival. The film, a diptych film about two people searching for their spouses in the backdrop of the Three Gorges Dam, was accompanied by the companion documentary Dong, about artist Liu Xiaodong.

The 2000s have seen Jia at a prolific period of his career. Following the success of Still Life, Jia was reported to be working on a gangster film, The Age of Tattoo ("Ciqing shidai"). Originally planned to be released in 2007, production on The Age of Tattoo was delayed after lead Jay Chou pulled out of the project, with Jia moving on to other films. These included a second documentary, Useless, about China's clothing manufacturing business, which garnered the director the Orizzonti Doc Prize at Venice in 2008, and 24 City, an ambitious work that conveys the historic changes that have swept across China in the last half-century through the lens of a single factory and the people connected to it by labor and blood. At the London Film Festival, 24 City was accompanied by another Jia short film, Cry Me a River, a romance starring Summer Palace actors, Hao Lei and Guo Xiaodong, and Jia regulars Zhao Tao and Wang Hongwei.

I Wish I Knew is a documentary exploring the changing face of Shanghai. I Wish I Knew debuted in the Un certain regard competition in the 2010 Cannes Film Festival.

During the press conference of 18 April 2013, Jia's film Tian Zhu Ding (A Touch of Sin) was nominated for the Palme d'Or at the 2013 Cannes Film Festival. He won the award for Best Screenplay. In April 2014, he was announced as a member of the main competition jury at the 2014 Cannes Film Festival.

His 2015 film Mountains May Depart was selected to compete for the Palme d'Or at the 2015 Cannes Film Festival.

In October 2017, Jia announced the establishment of the Pingyao International Film Festival (PYIFF) in Shanxi.

Style and influences 
Jia's films treat themes of alienated youth, contemporary Chinese history and globalization, as well as his signature usage of the long-take, colorful digital video and his minimalist/realist style. The World, in particular, with its portrayal of gaudy theme park filled with recreations of foreign landmarks is often noted for its critique of the globalization of China.

Jia's work speaks to a vision of "authentic" Chinese life, and his consistent return to the themes of alienation and disorientation fly in the face of the work of older filmmakers who present more idealized understandings of Chinese society. Critic Howard Feinstein described the director as a "rare breed of filmmaker capable of combining stunning artifice with documentary truth."

Critics have noted that whereas "Fifth Generation" filmmakers such as Zhang Yimou churn out export-friendly and lushly-colored wuxia dramas, Jia, as a "Sixth Generation" filmmaker, rejects the idealization of these narratives in favor of a more nuanced style. His films, from Xiao Wu and Unknown Pleasures to Platform and The World, eschew the son et lumière that characterizes so many contemporary Chinese exports. But the films' recurrent and reflexive use of "pop" motifs ensure that they are more self-aware than the similarly documentarian Chinese films of Jia's Sixth Generation peers.

Jia has commented in the past on the influence of filmmakers Hou Hsiao-hsien and Yasujirō Ozu on his work. I Wish I Knew, a 2010 documentary of his, features a segment about the 1972 documentary Chung Kuo, by Michelangelo Antonioni – another filmmaker to whose work Jia's own has been compared.

Filmography

As director

Feature films

Documentaries

Short films

As actor

As voice over artist

As producer 
(Excluding production credits for Jia's own directorial efforts.)

See also 
 Xstream Pictures – Jia Zhangke's production company, founded with Yu Lik-wai and Chow Keung

Works
 Jia Zhangke Speaks Out: The Chinese Film Director's Texts on Film. Piscataway, NJ: Transaction Publishers, 2014.

References

External links 

 
 
 Interview with Jia Zhangke

1970 births
Living people
Beijing Film Academy alumni
Chinese documentary filmmakers
Chinese film directors
Film directors from Shanxi
People from Lüliang
Post 70s Generation
Screenwriters from Shanxi
Film festival founders
Directors of Golden Lion winners
Best Director Asian Film Award winners
Cannes Film Festival Award for Best Screenplay winners